Frizzled-9 (Fz-9) is a protein that in humans is encoded by the FZD9 gene. Fz-9 has also been designated as CD349 (cluster of differentiation 349).

Function 

Members of the 'frizzled' gene family encode 7-transmembrane domain proteins that are receptors for Wnt signaling proteins.  The FZD9 gene is located within the Williams syndrome common deletion region of chromosome 7, and heterozygous deletion of the FZD9 gene may contribute to the Williams syndrome phenotype.  FZD9 is expressed predominantly in brain, testis, eye, skeletal muscle, and kidney.

References

Further reading

External links 
 
 

Clusters of differentiation
G protein-coupled receptors